FK Čierny Brod is a Slovak football team, based in the town of Čierny Brod. The club was founded in 1926.

External links 
Official website

References

Football clubs in Slovakia
Association football clubs established in 1926
1926 establishments in Slovakia